AdeS is a plant/soy-based beverage brand that includes a mixture of seeds with fruit juices and vitamins and minerals. In Japan, the drink is also known as I-Lohas. The name comes from the Spanish acronym, "Alimentos de Semillas" which means food from seeds. The brand currently has a presence in Brazil, Mexico, Argentina, Uruguay, Paraguay, Bolivia, Chile and Colombia.

History 
The product was created in Latin America in 1988. The Coca-Cola Company entered into an agreement on June 1, 2016, to acquire AdeS.  It is currently made by PT Coca-Cola Bottling Indonesia in Bekasi, West Java, which also produces Coca-Cola, Fanta and Sprite.

Notes

External links
 AdeS on Coca-Cola Indonesia Official Website
 Coca-Cola Amatil Indonesia - AdeS

Drink companies of Indonesia
Indonesian brands
Coca-Cola brands